Farnesyl diphosphate synthase may refer to:

 Z-farnesyl_diphosphate_synthase, EC 2.5.1.68
 Dimethylallyltranstransferase, EC 2.5.1.1